The 2015 World RX of Barcelona was the tenth round of the second season of the FIA World Rallycross Championship. The event was held at the Circuit de Barcelona-Catalunya in Montmeló, Catalonia.

Reigning champion and championship leader Petter Solberg took his third victory of the season, to extend his championship lead to 35 points over Timmy Hansen. Hansen, who had finished as top qualifier for the fourth meeting in succession – including two heat wins – also won a semi-final but could only finish third in the final, behind compatriot Johan Kristoffersson.

In the supporting round of the FIA European Rallycross Championship, Kristoffersson's teammate Ole Christian Veiby took his first victory after on-the-road winner Tommy Rustad, the championship leader, was disqualified after a breach of the championship regulations. Veiby finished ahead of compatriot Alexander Hvaal with Joni-Pekka Rajala of Finland completing the podium.

Heats

Semi-finals

World Championship

Semi-final 1

Semi-final 2

European Championship

Semi-final 1

Semi-final 2

Finals

World Championship

European Championship

Standings after the event

World Championship standings

European Championship standings

 Note: Only the top five positions are included for both sets of standings.

References

External links

|- style="text-align:center"
|width="35%"|Previous race:2015 World RX of France
|width="30%"|FIA World Rallycross Championship2015 season
|width="35%"|Next race:2015 World RX of Turkey
|- style="text-align:center"
|width="35%"|Previous race:None
|width="30%"|World RX of Barcelona
|width="35%"|Next race:2016 World RX of Barcelona
|- style="text-align:center"

Barcelona
World RX, Barcelona
World RX